Bill Flynn (October 17, 1917 – April 30, 1984) was an American politician. He served as a Democratic member for the 117th and 119th district of the Florida House of Representatives.

Flynn was born in Lutz, Florida, and raised in Miami. He graduated from Miami Senior High School and studied business administration at the University of Miami. He worked as a yardmaster for the Florida East Coast Railway, and owned a barbecue restaurant called Flynn's Dixie Ribs.

In 1974, Flynn was elected for the 119th district of the Florida House of Representatives, succeeding Jeff Gautier. In 1976 he was succeeded by Hugo Black III. In 1978 he was elected for the 117th district, succeeding Charles C. Papy Jr. He was succeeded by Scott W. McPherson in 1980.

Flynn died in April 1984 in Miami, at the age of 66.

References 

1917 births
1984 deaths
People from Lutz, Florida
Democratic Party members of the Florida House of Representatives
20th-century American politicians
University of Miami alumni
American restaurateurs
Yardmasters